Vasilisa Aliaksandraŭna Marzaliuk (born 23 June 1987) is a Belarusian wrestler. She is a three-time World bronze medalist and the 2011 European silver medalist. In June 2015, she represented Belarus at the inaugural European Games, winning gold in the women's freestyle 75 kg.

Marzaliuk appeared in the 72 kg category at the 2012 Summer Olympics, losing the bronze medal match to Spain's Maider Unda. She competed in women's freestyle 75 kg at the 2016 Summer Olympics in Rio de Janeiro. In the bronze medal match, she lost to China's Zhang Fengliu.

In 2020, she won one of the bronze medals in the women's 76 kg event at the Individual Wrestling World Cup held in Belgrade, Serbia. In March 2021, she qualified at the European Qualification Tournament to compete at the 2020 Summer Olympics in Tokyo, Japan. In April 2021, she competed in the 76 kg event at the European Wrestling Championships in Warsaw, Poland.

References

External links 
 

Living people
1987 births
Belarusian female sport wrestlers
Wrestlers at the 2012 Summer Olympics
Wrestlers at the 2016 Summer Olympics
Wrestlers at the 2020 Summer Olympics
Olympic wrestlers of Belarus
European Games gold medalists for Belarus
European Games medalists in wrestling
Wrestlers at the 2015 European Games
Wrestlers at the 2019 European Games
World Wrestling Championships medalists
People from Lahoysk District
European Wrestling Championships medalists
Sportspeople from Minsk Region
21st-century Belarusian women